The year 1569 in science and technology included a number of events, some of which are listed here.

Astronomy
 A lunar eclipse is observed by Cornelius Gemma.

Cartography
 The Mercator projection is first used in Gerardus Mercator's world map Nova et Aucta Orbis Terrae Descriptio ad Usum Navigantium Emendata.

Chemistry
 Paracelsus' major text on chemistry, Archidoxa, is published posthumously in Kraków in Latin translation by Adam Schröter.

Physiology and medicine
 Girolamo Mercuriale publishes De Arte Gymnastica in Venice, covering the ancient history and current practice of physical exercise.

Economics
 Tomás de Mercado publishes De los tratos de India y tratantes en ellas, linking the Price revolution to the influx of American gold.

Publications
 Cornelius Gemma publishes  in Antwerp.

Births
 Mutio Oddi, Italian mathematician (died 1639)

References

 
16th century in science
1560s in science